Para Mí is the fifth solo album by Mexican singer Yuridia.

Album development
After a 2-year hiatus to focus on her personal life, Yurida returned to the studio. Details emerged about the new album via a note on her official Facebook page announcing the release of her new single, Ya te Olvidé, to radio stations on October 31, 2011.

It was later announced that the album would be released in Mexico on December 6, 2011, followed by a Latin America release date of December 13, then in the U.S. on December 20.

Promotion
As part of a promotional tour, Yuridia visited major Mexican cities. Her first concert after the release of her newest effort, in which she performed new material, was held in Chilpancingo.

Chart performance
The album debuted at No. 1 on the AMPROFON charts and was certified Gold for selling over 30,000 copies. A week later, the album was certified Platinum for selling over 60,000 copies. On January 9, 2012, it was announced that Para Mi had been certified Double Platinum. As of Feb 23, 2012, the album is triple platinum.

Track listing

Charts

Weekly charts

Year-end charts

Album certification

References

Yuridia albums
2011 albums